YFU may refer to:
Youth For Understanding, a non-profit organisation
YFU: Harbor Utility Craft, a US Navy hull classification symbol